is a 2012 Japanese television drama series.

Plot
Maki Todo, a young woman, comes to Tokyo with dreams of becoming an actress. However, the theatrical troupe she belonged to disbanded, and she has become burdened with 6 million yen worth of debt. Maki begins working as a stand-in actress, playing everything from a corpse to a ghost to a newlywed, but will she ever find her success as an actress?

Cast
Mitsuki Tanimura as Maki Tōdō
Koji Yamamoto as Monzō Mizutori
Yasunori Danta as Tokitada Matsudaira
Yuri Shirahane as Mineko Fuji

Guest Stars
Yoshiko Miyazaki as Sakurako Shiratori (Episode 1)
Shugo Oshinari as Hiroto Shiratori (Episode 1)
Chika Uchida as Yurie Shiratori (Episode 1)
Rieko Miura as Nana Takeuchi (Episode 2)
Asahi Uchida as Hirano (Episode 2)

References

External links
Site 

Japanese drama television series
2012 Japanese television series debuts
Nippon TV original programming
Television shows based on Japanese novels